Banking business process outsourcing or banking BPO is a highly specialized sourcing strategy used by banks and lending institutions to support the business acquisition and account servicing activities associated with the customer lending lifecycle.  These specific BPO services are usually offered through multi-year service-level agreements for all or portions of the credit card lending, consumer lending or commercial lending segments of the financial services market. Some larger financial services organizations choose to extend their sourcing strategy to include other outsourced services such as ITO systems and software, human resources outsourcing and benefits services, finance and accounting outsourcing (FAO) services, procurement or training outsourcing.

Banking BPO services are typically defined by industry analysts, advisors and leaders in the sourcing industry, such as the set of discrete processes or transactional activities that support the  lending lifecycle as follows:
 New customer acquisition services include telemarketing activities, application processing, underwriting, customer or merchant credit evaluation and verification, credit approval, document processing, account opening and customer care and on-boarding.
 Account servicing processes for credit cards or consumer loans. These most commonly include payment processing systems and services, customer service or call center support operations (voice, digital, email and mail services), product renewals, and loan disbursement; document management services such as printing and mailing of statements, networked printing and storage solutions; collections, recoveries processing, default management, risk management and foreclosure.
 Consumer and commercial lending post origination transaction processing services, such as check processing, clearance and settlement services, remittance, and records management.
 Back office transaction process management for loans or credit card portfolios, including custody services, fraud mitigation and detection, regulatory and program compliance, portfolio analytics, reporting, conversions, management of technology platforms, interface for customer data and custom development.

References 

 Sourcing for Survival: What Impact is the Credit Crunch Having on Sourcing in the Financial Services Sector? Tony Rawlinson, Managing Director of EquaTerra’s Financial Services practice; https://web.archive.org/web/20110710200931/http://www.equaterra.com/_filelib/FileCabinet/News/EquaTerra_Article_Sourcing_for_Survival_Alternative_Investment_Review_2009.pdf?
 Outsourcing IT and Business Processes: A Supervisory Primer http://www.newyorkfed.org/banking/outsource.html
 Financial Services Offshoring: Moving Toward Fewer Captives and Global Cost Competitiveness, The Conference Board, May 2010; https://www.conference-board.org/publications/publicationdetail.cfm?publicationid=1767

External links 
 Outsourcing in Financial Services; http://www.bis.org/publ/joint12.html
 Financial and Banking Sector BPO; https://www.ncri.com/

Business process
Business terms
Information technology management
Outsourcing